George Montgomery (September 23, 1899 – March 5, 1951) was an American set decorator. He was nominated for an Academy Award in the category Best Art Direction for the film Ladies in Retirement. He worked on 74 films between 1941 and 1951.

Selected filmography
 Ladies in Retirement (1941)

References

External links

1899 births
1951 deaths
American set decorators